Macrocheilia is a condition of permanent swelling of the lip that results from greatly distended lymphatic spaces. This causes an abnormal largeness of the lips. This is sometimes seen in leprosy patients.

See also
 Nevus psiloliparus
 List of cutaneous conditions

References

External links 

 eMedicine: Lip reduction

Congenital disorders of eye, ear, face and neck
Lip disorders
Cutaneous congenital anomalies